The 2016 Afghanistan earthquake was a magnitude 6.6 earthquake which struck  west-southwest of Ashkasham on April 10, at a depth of . The shock had a maximum intensity of V (Moderate). The earthquake killed at least 5 people in Pakistan's Khyber Pakhtunkhwa and one in Gilgit Baltistan. A further 46 were injured in both provinces. The tremors shook up Peshawar, Chitral, Swat, Gilgit, Faisalabad and Lahore. The Himalayas region is one of earth's most seismically active regions. The tremors were felt in Delhi, National Capital Region, Kashmir and Uttarakhand. In Delhi, some 1,000 kilometers (620 miles) from the epicentre, the Delhi Metro was temporarily halted.

Two aftershocks had been felt, with magnitudes of 4.1 and 4.2. There were additionally at least 10 foreshocks felt, with the largest having a magnitude of 4.5 on April 8, 2016.

See also
 List of 21st-century earthquakes
 List of earthquakes in 2016
 List of earthquakes in Afghanistan
 List of earthquakes in Pakistan

References

External links
 Deadly earthquake Afghanistan on Earthquake Report Website
 

2016 disasters in Pakistan
2016 earthquakes
2016 in Afghanistan
April 2016 events in Afghanistan 
April 2016 events in Pakistan
Earthquakes in Afghanistan
Earthquakes in Pakistan
2016 disasters in Afghanistan